Myosin-8 is a protein that in humans is encoded by the MYH8 gene.

Mutations in MYH8 are associated with Trismus pseudocamptodactyly syndrome.

References

Further reading